The 2013 Indonesian Masters Grand Prix Gold (officially known as the Yonex Sunrise Indonesia Open 2013 for sponsorship reasons) was the tenth grand prix gold and grand prix tournament of the 2013 BWF Grand Prix Gold and Grand Prix. The tournament was held in GOR Among Rogo, Yogyakarta, Indonesia September 24 until September 29, 2013 and had a total purse of $120,000.

Men's singles

Seeds

  Tommy Sugiarto (semi-final)
  Sony Dwi Kuncoro (semi-final)
  Dionysius Hayom Rumbaka (final)
  Mohd Arif Abdul Latif (second round)
  Alamsyah Yunus (third round)
  Derek Wong Zi Liang (quarter-final)
  Suppanyu Avihingsanon (quarter-final)
  Wisnu Yuli Prasetyo (quarter-final)
  Iskandar Zulkarnain Zainuddin (third round)
  Ashton Chen Yong Zhao (third round)
  Simon Santoso (champion)
  Goh Soon Huat (second round)
  Riyanto Subagja (second round)
  Ng Ka Long (second round)
  Robin Gonansa (third round)
  Loh Wei Sheng (third round)

Finals

Top half

Section 1

Section 2

Section 3

Section 4

Bottom half

Section 5

Section 6

Section 7

Section 8

Women's singles

Seeds

  Lindaweni Fanetri (quarter-final)
  Aprilia Yuswandari (semi-final)
  Gu Juan (second round)
  Bellaetrix Manuputty (quarter-final)
  Adriyanti Firdasari (first round)
  Hera Desi (first round)
  Tee Jing Yi (first round)
  Febby Angguni (quarter-final)

Finals

Top half

Section 1

Section 2

Bottom half

Section 3

Section 4

Men's doubles

Seeds

  Mohammad Ahsan / Hendra Setiawan (quarter-final)
  Angga Pratama / Ryan Agung Saputra (champion)
  Yonathan Suryatama / Hendra Aprida Gunawan (second round)
  Wahyu Nayaka / Ade Yusuf (quarter-final)
  Markis Kido / Markus Fernaldi Gideon (semi-final)
  Andrei Adistia / Didit Juang Indrianto (second round)
  Berry Angriawan / Ricky Karanda Suwardi (semi-final)
  Yohanes Rendy Sugiarto / Muhammad Ulinnuha (quarter-final)

Finals

Top half

Section 1

Section 2

Bottom half

Section 3

Section 4

Women's doubles

Seeds

  Pia Zebadiah Bernadeth / Rizki Amelia Pradipta (first round)
  Vivian Hoo Kah Mun / Woon Khe Wei (withdrew)
  Gebby Ristiyani Imawan / Tiara Rosalia Nuraidah (second round)
  Vita Marissa / Variella Aprilsasi (semi-final)
  Greysia Polii / Nitya Krishinda Maheswari (quarter-final)
  Shinta Mulia Sari / Yao Lei (semi-final)
  Ng Hui Ern / Ng Hui Lin (first round)
  Anggia Shitta Awanda / Della Destiara Haris (quarter-final)

Finals

Top half

Section 1

Section 2

Bottom half

Section 3

Section 4

Mixed doubles

Seeds

  Tontowi Ahmad / Lilyana Natsir (final)
  Muhammad Rijal / Debby Susanto (second round)
  Markis Kido / P Z Bernadeth (second round)
  Riky Widianto / Richi Puspita Dili (second round)
  Danny Bawa Chrisnanta / Vanessa Neo Yu Yan (first round)
  Praveen Jordan / Vita Marissa (champion)
  Tan Aik Quan / Lai Pei Jing (first round)
  Irfan Fadhilah / Weni Anggraini (second round)

Finals

Top half

Section 1

Section 2

Bottom half

Section 3

Section 4

References

Indonesian Masters (badminton)
Indonesia
2013 in Indonesian sport
Sports competitions in Yogyakarta
Indonesia Open Grand Prix Gold